Kunani Rural District is a rural district (dehestan) in Kunani District, Kuhdasht County, Lorestan Province, Iran. At the 2006 census, its population was 11,596, in 2,364 families.  The rural district has 22 villages.

References 

Rural Districts of Lorestan Province
Kuhdasht County